Donald Thomas Beardsley (born 23 October 1946 in Alyth, Perthshire) is a Scottish former footballer who made more than 200 appearances in the English Football League playing as a full back for Hull City, Doncaster Rovers and Grimsby Town. He played in the first game in England to be decided by a penalty shootout, the semi-final of the Watney Cup on 5 August 1970 in which Hull City lost to Manchester United at Boothferry Park.

References

External links
 

1946 births
Living people
People from Perth and Kinross
Scottish footballers
Association football fullbacks
Hull City A.F.C. players
Doncaster Rovers F.C. players
Grimsby Town F.C. players
Louth United F.C. players
English Football League players